Gularia Bhindara is a town and a nagar panchayat in Pilibhit district in the Indian state of Uttar Pradesh.

Demographics
As of the 2001 Indian census, Gularia Bhindara had a population of 6,183. Males constitute 55% of the population and females 45%. Gularia Bhindara has an average literacy rate of 60%, just a shade higher than the national average of 59.5%: male literacy is 66%, and female literacy is 51%. In Gularia Bhindara, 14% of the population is under 6 years of age.

References

Cities and towns in Pilibhit district